Urakhach (also Urukhach) or Ulubaba is a village de facto in the Askeran Province of the breakaway Republic of Artsakh, de jure in the Khojaly District of Azerbaijan, in the disputed region of Nagorno-Karabakh.

History 
During the Soviet period, the village was a part of the Askeran District of the Nagorno-Karabakh Autonomous Oblast.

Economy and culture 
The village is part of the community of Khachen. As of 2015, the village is uninhabited.

References

External links 
 

Populated places in Askeran Province
Populated places in Khojaly District